Silene laciniata is a perennial herb in the family (Caryophyllaceae), commonly known as fringed Indian pink, cardinal catchfly, Mexican campion, Mexican-pink, and campion.

It is native to the southwestern United States from California to Texas, as well as northern Mexico.

Description

Growth pattern
Silene laciniata grows from a taproot and has one or many decumbent to erect stems which may exceed a meter (3 ft.) in height. many stems.

Leaves and stems 
The slender, branching stem is glandular and sticky.

The lance-shaped leaves are up to about 10 centimeters long by 2 wide, with smaller ones occurring on upper parts of the plant.

Inflorescence and fruit
The inflorescence may have one flower or many, each on a long pedicel. The flower has a tubular green or reddish calyx of fused sepals which is lined with ten prominent veins. The five bright red petals are each divided deeply into 4 to 6 long, pointed lobes, sometimes appearing fringed.

The pistil has three parts. There are ten stamens.

Subspecies
Subspecies include:
 Silene laciniata subsp. brandegeei 
 Silene laciniata subsp. californica 
 Silene laciniata subsp. greggii 
 Silene laciniata subsp. laciniata
 Silene laciniata subsp. major

References

External links
CalFlora Database: Silene laciniata (cardinal catchfly)
USDA Plants Profile for Silene laciniata (cardinal catchfly)
Jepson eFlora: Silene laciniata
Flora of North America
Silene laciniata — U.C. Photo gallery

laciniata
Flora of Arizona
Flora of Baja California
Flora of California
Flora of New Mexico
Flora of Texas
Flora of the Sierra Nevada (United States)
Natural history of the California chaparral and woodlands
Natural history of the California Coast Ranges
Natural history of the Peninsular Ranges
Natural history of the Transverse Ranges
Flora without expected TNC conservation status
Taxa named by Antonio José Cavanilles